William Henry Duffy (born 12 May 1961) is an English Jewish Irish rock musician, best known as the guitarist of the band The Cult.

Early life
Duffy was born and grew up in Manchester. He has Irish and Jewish heritage and ancestry. He began playing the guitar at the age of fourteen, being influenced by the music of Queen, Thin Lizzy, The Who, Aerosmith, Blue Öyster Cult, and the early work of Led Zeppelin. In the late 1970s he became involved in the punk movement, being influenced by the New York Dolls, The Stooges, Buzzcocks, and The Sex Pistols, as well as AC/DC (which he views as a proto-punk group). He started playing lead guitar with a number of different punk acts whilst still in school in the late 1970s, including the Studio Sweethearts. In the Manchester scene he personally influenced Johnny Marr to start performing as a guitarist, and encouraged Morrissey to make his first foray as singer/frontman with a punk-rock act titled The Nosebleeds.

After leaving school, Duffy left Manchester when the Studio Sweethearts moved to London, working for a period as a shop assistant at Johnsons in the King's Road, in Chelsea. The Studio Sweethearts subsequently broke up and Duffy began playing lead guitar part-time with the band entitled Theatre of Hate. Shortly after he met Ian Astbury, who was at that time the frontman/lead vocalist with the Southern Death Cult, who was sufficiently impressed with Duffy's talents that he quit the Southern Death Cult to start a new band with him called Death Cult. After releasing two singles, the band shortened its name to The Cult. In The Cult's debut single "Spiritwalker", Duffy created a distinctive flanged sound using an unfashionable at the time choice of guitar - a mid 1970s Gretsch White Falcon, which became his trademark sound and image. This was followed up the album titled Love. It featured the hit "She Sells Sanctuary".

Career

Late 1980s and 1990s 
Duffy helped change The Cult's sound into metal-blues for their third album, 1987's Electric.

Duffy moved to Los Angeles in 1988 with Astbury, where both remain. There, the two writing partners (with longtime bassist Jamie Stewart) turned to stadium rock and recorded Sonic Temple. The Cult reached a larger, mainstream audience, but the public's attention could not be sustained with their next album, Ceremony, at the dawn of the grunge age.

Following the 'Ceremonial Stomp' tour of 1992, Astbury pressured Duffy to return to their roots, with The Cult's The Cult album. This would ultimately lead to Astbury's departure from Duffy and The Cult in 1995.

During The Cult's four-year hiatus, Duffy played with Mike Peters of The Alarm in a project called Coloursound.

Duffy plays on the title track from Japanese musician J's 1997 debut album, Pyromania.

The Cult reformation 
Duffy reformed The Cult with Astbury in 1999, which led to a new recording contract with Atlantic Records. This was capped off by a show at Atlanta's Music Midtown Festival in May 2001, where over 60,000 people watched them perform, leading up to the release of Beyond Good and Evil.

Their single to promote it, "Rise", which reached No. 125 in the US and No. 3 for 6 weeks on the mainstream rock chart, was removed from radio rotation a week after the album's release. Disappointing sales, reviews, and tour attendance ensued. In 2002 Astbury sent The Cult onto a hiatus once more, when he accepted an offer to sing with The Doors.

2004 onward 

In early 2004, Duffy formed the covers band Cardboard Vampyres alongside Alice in Chains guitarist/vocalist Jerry Cantrell. Also in the band were Mötley Crüe and Ratt vocalist John Corabi, The Cult bassist Chris Wyse and drummer Josh Howser. The band played at various venues in the United States between 2004 and 2005. They predominantly played along the West Coast. No albums were released by the band.

The Cult reformed in early 2006 and after playing several US concerts toured Europe. Duffy appeared in Ethan Dettenmaier's film, Sin-Jin Smyth, which was filmed in 2006, but remains unreleased.

In early 2006 Duffy recorded a debut album with his new band, Circus Diablo. The album was recorded with Duffy playing lead guitar and former Cult touring bass player Billy Morrison handling lead vocals and bass guitar duties. Former The Almighty frontman, Ricky Warwick, played rhythm guitar on the CD. The former Cult, current Velvet Revolver, drummer Matt Sorum also played on the record.

After the completion of the album, former Fuel member Brett Scallions was added as bassist so Morrison could focus on being the lead singer. Then Jeremy Colson, formerly with Steve Vai, was brought in to be the full-time drummer for the band. Duffy's involvement ended in 2007.

In 2007, he was a judge on Bodog Music's Battle of the Bands.

In 2010, Duffy appeared on the TV-series, Married to Rock, which starred his girlfriend AJ Celi. In October 2012, he performed with Sammy Hagar and Michael Anthony at the Cabo Wabo Cantina for Sammy Hagar's Birthday Bash in Cabo San Lucas, Mexico.

In an October 2016 interview with PopMatters journalist J.C. Maçek III, Duffy spoke about his favorite Cult song, saying "Jonesy [former Sex Pistols guitarist turned radio host Steve Jones] on Jonesy's Jukebox just played 'Love' from the Love album and that's my favorite Cult song," he tells me proudly. "I actually got, I have to admit, a teeny bit of a goose bump because it just captured exactly what I wanted to say with that kind of haunting rock. Kind of swaggery but not heavy, it's got ... Duffy searches for the right words to express his emotion at hearing the song from the outside, "I mean nobody ... I don't know who makes music like that!"

Between 2012 and 2016, Duffy appeared with the Kings of Chaos.

Personal life
Billy Duffy identifies as being of Jewish ancestry and heritage. As of 2020, Duffy is engaged to former glamour model Leilani Dowding.

Duffy is an avid Manchester City F.C. fan.

Guitars and equipment
In January 2013, Gretsch introduced the Billy Duffy White Falcon G7593T guitar.

Portrayals in media
In the feature film, England Is Mine, a biopic about the early years of Morrissey, Billy Duffy is played by Adam Lawrence.

References

External links

1961 births
Living people
English rock guitarists
English heavy metal guitarists
English songwriters
Lead guitarists
Hollywood United players
Musicians from Manchester
People from Hulme
The Cult members
Theatre of Hate members
Association footballers not categorized by position
Dead Men Walking members
Association football players not categorized by nationality
English people of Jewish descent
English people of Irish descent